Jessie Aney (born 19 April 1998) is an American tennis player.

Aney has career-high WTA rankings of 369 in singles and 141 in doubles, both achieved November 2022. She has won two singles and ten doubles titles on the ITF Women's Circuit.

Aney won her biggest title to date at the 2021 ITS Cup, where she won the doubles event partnering Anna Sisková.

ITF Circuit finals

Singles: 3 (2 titles, 1 runner–up)

Doubles: 17 (10 titles, 7 runner–ups)

References

External links
 
 
 Jessie Aney at University of North Carolina at Chapel Hill

1998 births
Living people
American female tennis players
Sportspeople from Rochester, Minnesota
North Carolina Tar Heels women's tennis players
Tennis people from Minnesota